Kamenskaya Street is a street in Tsentralny City District of Novosibirsk, Russia. The street starts from Oktyabrskaya Magistral, runs north and forms a T-intersection with Pisarev Street.

Architecture
 Rabochaya Pyatiletka is a zig zag building built in the 1930s
 Soyuzzoloto House is a constructivist building on the corner of Kamenskaya and Oktyabrskaya streets. It was built in 1932.
 Baths No 8 is a public bath built in 1937.
 Doubletree by Hilton is a hotel built in 2010. It is located on the corner of Kamenskaya and Chaplygin streets.

Churches
 Transfiguration Cathedral is a catholic cathedral on the corner of Kamenskaya and Gorky streets. It was built in 1997.

Educational institutions
 Novosibirsk Music College named after Askold Murov
 Novosibirsk State Choreographic College
 Novosibirsk State University of Economics and Management
 Novosibirsk Trade and Economic College

Cultural organizations
 Beit Menakhem is a Jewish community cultural center. It is located on the corner of Kamenskaya and Shetinkin Street.
 Novosibirsk Globus Theatre
 Novosibirsk Musical Theater

Sports objects
 Spartak Stadium

Parks
 Central Park

Retail
 Central Market
 Galereya Novosibirsk Shopping Mall
 Jupiter Shopping Center
 Moskva Shopping Center

References

Tsentralny City District, Novosibirsk
Streets in Novosibirsk